Leo Lemay (September 23, 1909 - September 9, 1983) was a Roman Catholic bishop.

Born in Lawrence, Massachusetts, United States, Lemay was ordained for the Society of Mary on August 15, 1933. On June 14, 1960, Lemay was appointed bishop of the Vicariate Apostolic of Northern Solomon Islands, Papua New Guinea, and titular bishop of Agbia. He was ordained bishop on September 21, 1960. On November 15, 1966, Lemay was appointed first bishop of the Roman Catholic Diocese of Bougainville. On July 1, 1974, Lemay resigned.

Notes

1909 births
1983 deaths
People from Lawrence, Massachusetts
20th-century Roman Catholic bishops in Papua New Guinea
Catholics from Massachusetts
Roman Catholic bishops of Bougainville
20th-century American Roman Catholic priests